The discography of Set Your Goals, an American rock band, consists of three studio albums, two extended plays and three singles.

Studio albums

Extended plays

Singles

Other appearances

Videography

Video albums

Music videos

References

Discographies of American artists